Kamarajapuram is a neighbourhood in Pammal, Chennai.It is also known as Pammal Kamarajapuram.But it comes under Anakaputhur Municipality.

References

Chennai